The English Disease is an album by British producer Adrian Sherwood, issued under the moniker Barmy Army. It was released on October 1989 by On-U Sound Records.

Track listing

Personnel 

Musicians
David Harrow – keyboards (A4), programming (B2), drum programming (B3)
Al Jourgensen – keyboards (A2)
Skip McDonald – guitar (A1, A3, B1-B3), producer (A1, B1, B5)
Mike – keyboards (A5)
Bonjo Iyabinghi Noah – percussion (A1, A3, A4, B1, B4)
Carlton "Bubblers" Ogilvie – bass guitar (A3, A4)
Rolo – bass guitar (A2)
Style Scott – drums (A2, A3-A5, B4)
Adrian Sherwood – effects (A2), producer, recording
Doug Wimbish – bass guitar (A1, A4, B1-B5), drum programming (A1, B1, B5), producer (A1, B1, B5)
Jah Wobble – percussion (A5, B4)
Kishi Yamamoto – bass guitar (A5, B4), keyboards (A4)

Technical personnel
Steve Barker – recording
Steve "Barney" Chase – engineering
Kevin Metcalfe – mastering
Andy Montgomery – engineering
Dave Pine – engineering
Steve Redhead – recording
Marc Williams – recording

Release history

References

External links 
 

1989 albums
Adrian Sherwood albums
On-U Sound Records albums
Albums produced by Adrian Sherwood